VIPER (Volatiles Investigating Polar Exploration Rover) is a lunar rover developed by NASA (Ames Research Center), and currently planned to be delivered to the surface of the Moon in November 2024. The rover will be tasked with prospecting for lunar resources in permanently shadowed areas in the lunar south pole region, especially by mapping the distribution and concentration of water ice. The mission builds on a previous NASA rover concept called Resource Prospector, which was cancelled in 2018.

On 11 June 2020, NASA awarded Astrobotic Technology of Pittsburgh, Pennsylvania, US$199.5 million to launch VIPER to the lunar south pole. VIPER will be carried aboard Astrobotic's Griffin lander as part of NASA's Commercial Lunar Payload Services (CLPS) initiative. Astrobotic is responsible for end-to-end services for delivery of VIPER, including integration with its Griffin lander, launch from Earth, and landing on the Moon.

Overview 

The VIPER rover, currently in development, will have a size similar to a golf cart (around 1.4 × 1.4 × 2 m), and will be tasked with prospecting for lunar resources, especially for water ice, mapping its distribution, and measuring its depth and purity. The water distribution and form must be better understood before it can be evaluated as a potential resource within any evolvable lunar or Mars campaign.

The VIPER rover is part of the Lunar Discovery and Exploration Program managed by the Science Mission Directorate at NASA Headquarters, and it is meant to support the crewed Artemis program. NASA's Ames Research Center is managing the rover project. The hardware for the rover is being designed by the Johnson Space Center, while the instruments are provided by Ames, Kennedy, and Honeybee Robotics. The project manager is Daniel Andrews, and the project scientist is Anthony Colaprete, who is implementing the technology developed for the now cancelled Resource Prospector rover. The estimated cost of the mission is US$250 million in October 2019. NASA said on 3 March 2021 that the new lifecycle cost for the mission is US$433.5 million.

The VIPER rover will operate on the western edge of Nobile crater on the Moon's south pole. It is planned to rove several kilometers, collecting data on different kinds of soil environments affected by light and temperature — those in complete darkness, occasional light and in constant sunlight. Once it enters a permanently shadowed location, it will operate on battery power alone and will not be able to recharge them until it drives to a sunlit area. Its total operation time will be 100 Earth days.

Both the launcher and the lander to be used are competitively provided through Commercial Lunar Payload Services (CLPS) contractors, with Astrobotic delivering the Griffin lander and SpaceX providing the Falcon Heavy launch vehicle. NASA is aiming to land the rover in November 2024.

Science background 

Data obtained by Luna 24, Lunar Reconnaissance Orbiter, Chandrayaan-1, and the Lunar Crater Observation and Sensing Satellite, revealed that lunar water is distributed widely (if thinly) across the Moon's surface, especially within permanently shadowed craters in the south pole region.

Water may have been delivered to the Moon over geological timescales by the regular bombardment of water-bearing comets, asteroids and meteoroids, or continuously produced in situ by the hydrogen ions (protons) of the solar wind impacting oxygen-bearing minerals. The water ice is unlikely to be present in the form of thick, pure ice deposits, but as thin coating on soil grains.

If it is possible to mine and extract the water molecules in large amounts, it can be broken down to its elements, namely hydrogen and oxygen, and form molecular hydrogen and molecular oxygen to be used as rocket bi-propellant or produce compounds for metallurgic and chemical production processes. Just the production of propellant, was estimated by a joint panel of industry, government and academic experts, identified a near-term annual demand of 450 metric tons of lunar-derived propellant equating to 2450 metric tons of processed lunar water, generating US$2.4 billion of revenue annually.

Science payload 
The VIPER rover will be equipped with a drill and three analyzers. The Neutron Spectrometer System (NSS), will detect sub-surface water from a distance, then, VIPER will stop at that location and deploy a  drill called TRIDENT to obtain samples to be analyzed by its two onboard spectrometers:

See also 

 Lunar water
  
 Chandrayaan-3

References 

Commercial Lunar Payload Services
Lunar rovers
Missions to the Moon
2024 in spaceflight